The Most Reverend John C. O'Riordan, Bishop Emeritus, C.S.Sp., COR (6 January 1924 – 22 November 2016) was Bishop of the Catholic Diocese of Kenema in Sierra Leone.

Early life 
He was the second youngest son of Mary (née Murphy) and David O'Riordan and he was born in Effin, County Limerick, Ireland. His father managed a creamery in Kilmallock. His mother was a school teacher. He had eight brothers and sisters, two of whom became also priests.

From 1937 to 1943, he boarded in County Dublin at Blackrock College, founded and administered by the Spiritan Order.

Priestly life 
He entered the Holy Ghost Fathers at Kilshane Novitiate in Tipperary in 1943. His ordination took place in 1952.

Ministry in Sierra Leone 
In 1953, he was sent to Sierra Leone where he began a ministry that would last for almost 50 years.

As a young priest, he drove along the dirt roads to remote villages where he got to know the residents and said Mass with them. He developed relationships with the local paramount chiefs and elders and soon came to see Sierra Leone as a place where he had always belonged.

His practical approach involved training community workers as well as the establishment of hospitals, schools and pastoral centers. He was often involved with every aspect of the building process from mixing concrete to physical construction.

A skilled diplomat, he deftly navigated an interfaith community in which Christians were the minority.

Bishop of Kenema 

He was appointed bishop of the Diocese of Kenema on June 4, 1984 and consecrated December 2, 1984.

Affectionately known as Bishop Johnny in the local community., he ordained more than twelve Sierra Leonean priests during his tenure.

From 1992-1995 he served as President of Inter-territorial Catholic Bishops' Conference of The Gambia and Sierra Leone.

Sierra Leone Civil War 
The Sierra Leone Civil War began in 1991 when the Revolutionary United Front attempted to overthrown Joseph Saidu Momoh, then president.

Bishop Johnny continued his ministry in Sierra Leone during the civil war with mass killings, mass rape, torture and the recruitment of child soldiers became widespread.  He was an outspoken critic of the war and vociferously urged top officials in the military to put an end to the killing.

When the war ended in 2002, over 50 000 people had been killed.

Honors 
In 2001, Bishop O'Riordan was award Sierra Leone's Commander of the Order of Rokel (COR), the country's highest honor for outstanding pastoral and humanitarian services.

Later Ministry 
Describing Bishop Johnny's ministry, a Sierra Leone-born priest said, “He stood with us in war and walked with us in peace.”

In 2002 Bishop Johnny retired to Ireland on 26 April 2002.

Death 
He died peacefully at the age of 92 at Marian House in Dublin, Ireland on 22 November 2016. His funeral was held on 25 November 2016 at Church of The Holy Spirit, Kimmage Manor, Dublin. He is buried in the Spiritan plot in Dardistown, County Dublin.

Memorial in Sierra Leone 
Bishop O'Riordan remains a beloved figure in Sierra Leone. On 10 February 2017, the Diocese of Kenema invited clergy from across the nation to celebrate a memorial Mass in Bishop Johnny's honor.

Edward Charles, Archbishop of Freetown gave the Eucharist and Bishop Aruna, Auxiliary Bishop of Kenema paid tribute to Bishop O'Riordan's life and ministry in the homily.

References

External links 
 Catholic-Hierarchy
 Bishop John O'Riordan Passes On
 Obituary: Bishop John O’Riordan

1924 births
2016 deaths
20th-century Roman Catholic bishops in Sierra Leone
21st-century Roman Catholic bishops in Sierra Leone
Roman Catholic bishops of Kenema
Burials at Dardistown Cemetery
Holy Ghost Fathers
Irish Spiritans
Presidents of Inter-territorial Catholic Bishops' Conference of The Gambia and Sierra Leone
Roman Catholic missionaries in Sierra Leone
People educated at Blackrock College
Irish expatriates in Sierra Leone